Craigie Burn Dam is an arch/earth-fill type dam located on the Mnyamvubu River, near Greytown, KwaZulu-Natal, South Africa. It was established in 1963 and its primary purpose is for irrigation usage. Recent assessments however, assign a significant hazard potential to the dam/reservoir which in turn makes the intended use questionable.

See also
List of reservoirs and dams in South Africa
List of rivers of South Africa

References 

 List of South African Dams from the South African Department of Water Affairs

External links 
Craigie Burn (reservoir) - DWAF

Dams in South Africa
Dams completed in 1963